Arrow Lake may refer to:

Places
 Arrow Lake (Flathead County, Montana), in Glacier National Park, US
 Arrow Lake (Western Australia), a lake in Western Australia
 Arrow Lakes, in British Columbia, Canada
 Arrow Lakes Provincial Park
 Arrow Lakes Hospital
 Arrow Lakes Generating Station

Other uses
 Arrow Lakes people, a Canadian First Nations people

See also